The Ford FK, short for "Ford Köln," is a series of medium-duty trucks built by Ford of Germany in their Cologne (Köln) plant in two generations from 1951 until 1961. The Ford "Köln" name replaced the earlier Rhein and Ruhr badges as competitor Krupp (Südwerke) had quietly copyrighted them. Ford Germany withdrew from the truck sector after 1961, focusing on lighter utility vehicles and imports from Ford UK.

First generation

The FK's headlights were integrated in the fenders and the prominent grille consisted of seven horizontal chromed strips. The earlier, smaller Ford Rhein-series of trucks had been built with a petrol V8 engine, but as it was not very economical Ford decided to install a diesel engine. The choice fell on a   unit from American engine manufacturer Hercules; the engine was built under license for Ford by Knorr in Munich with a Bosch fuel injection system. This was installed in the Rhein series, but also in the  FK 3500D and the  FK 4000 which arrived in 1953.

In 1953, the underpowered four-cylinder engines, carried over from the 1932 Ford BB and developed from the 1927 Model A's engine, were discontinued. The comparatively high-revving, low-compression Hercules diesels had a very bad reputation for quality and served to hurt Ford's reputation in the truck market. At this time the Ford Köln also received a redesigned cabin, with a square, chromed grille, a split windshield, and a shorter bonnet. The shorter cab allowed for a longer cargo space with better weight distribution.

Forward control versions were also offered to market, but only a small number of units was actually sold.

Second generation
The second generation of FKs was introduced at the very end of 1955 and were nicknamed Haifisch ("Shark") due to their toothy grilles. The shape was much modern, with a one-piece, curved windshield, a rounded nose, and a grille with twelve vertical, chromed elements. The range included three main models: the  FK 2500, the  FK 3500, and the  FK 4500. The FK has a ladder frame chassis with leaf sprung live axles front and rear and hydraulic brakes on all four wheels. Four- or five-speed transmissions were available.

The two-stroke design, developed by Professor Hans List of Graz, Austria for Gräf & Stift, was chosen as it was believed that its minimum number of moving parts would provide both reliability and economy. However, reality proved otherwise. The cylinders deformed around the exhaust ports, and engine failures were rife. In the first half of 1956, warranty claims outnumbered new truck deliveries. Production of new engines was repeatedly halted in order to be able to carry out rebuilds. By the middle of 1957 the diesels were discontinued, leaving only the petrol V8 to soldier on until 1961. The disastrous experience is generally credited with ending Ford Germany's involvement with trucks. The pressing tools for the cabin were transferred to Ford UK in 1962, who used them for the Thames Trader NC, later sold as the Ford K-series.

References

FK
FK
Vehicles introduced in 1951
Trucks of Germany